John Brennan was born at Ballahide, County Carlow, about 1768 and died in Dublin on 29 July 1830. The Compendium of Irish Biography (1878) says of him:

External links
 http://www.libraryireland.com/biography/JohnBrennan.php

1760s births
1830 deaths
18th-century Irish medical doctors
19th-century Irish medical doctors
People from County Carlow
Medical doctors from Dublin (city)
Irish classical scholars
Irish editors